America's Gilded Age, the post-Civil War and post-Reconstruction era, from 1865 to 1901 saw unprecedented economic and industrial prosperity.  As a result of this prosperity, the nation's wealthiest families were able to construct monumental country estates in the Berkshires in Massachusetts.

History
Although most uses of 'cottage' imply a small house, the use of the word in this context refers to an alternative definition, "a summer residence (often on a large and sumptuous scale)".

Cottages
Approximately seventy-six estates were built in Lenox and Stockbridge, Massachusetts, including:

 Allen Winden
 Ashintully
 Beaupré
 Bellefontaine
 Belvoir Terrace
 Blantyre
 Bluestone Manor
 Bonnie Brae
 Breezy Corners
 Brookhurst
 Brookside
 Cherry Hill
 Chesterwood
 Clipston Grange
 Coldbrook
 Deepdene
 Eastover
 Edgewood
 Elm Court
 Erskine Park
 Groton Place
 Gusty Gables
 High Lawn
 Kellogg Terrace
 Lakeside
 Merrywood
 Naumkeag
 Nestledown
 Norwood
 Oakwood
 Orleton
 Oronoque
 Overlee
 Pine Acre
 Pine Needles
 Rock Ridge
 Searles Castle
 Shadowbrook
 Spring Lawn
 Stonover
 Summerwood
 Sunnyridge
 Tanglewood
 The Homestead
 The Mount
 Valleyhead
 Ventfort Hall
 Villa Virginia
 Wheatleigh
 Windyside
 Wyndhurst

See also
 List of Gilded Age mansions

References

External links
 The Museum of the Gilded Age at Ventfort Hall
Bob Vila tour of Berkshire cottages

Stockbridge, Massachusetts
Massachusetts culture
Buildings and structures in Lenox, Massachusetts
Houses in Berkshire County, Massachusetts
Gilded Age